The Archbishop of Hong Kong is the senior bishop, spiritual and moral leader of the Anglican Province of Hong Kong Sheng Kung Hui and the Primate of Hong Kong. The Archbishop of the Province is elected from among the diocesan bishops by the General Synod in which all Houses meet in a joint session. It is notable that the Archbishop ranks first among the religious leaders in the order of precedence of Hong Kong.

The current Archbishop of Hong Kong is Andrew Chan who also serves as the Bishop of Western Kowloon. The Bishop's House, located in Central, is the office and official residence of the Archbishop.

Functions and duties
The Archbishop chairs the meeting of the Provincial General Synod. As the chief pastor of the Province, he is responsible for:

 speaking in the name of the Church or the General Synod;
 giving leadership in initiating and developing policy and strategy of the Church, including implementation of resolutions of the General Synod throughout the Church;
 representing the Province in its relationship with the rest of the Anglican Communion and with other churches, and on behalf of the Province, communicating with other primates;
 ordering for the consecration and installation of Diocesan Bishops when duly elected, and from time to time, assembling other bishops to meet with the new Diocesan bishop;
 convening and presiding over the meetings of the General Synod, the House of Bishops, and the Standing Committee;
 visiting every Diocese, Missionary Diocese and Missionary Area and holding pastoral consultations with the Bishops thereof;
 preaching the Word; and
 celebrating Sacraments.

List of archbishops

References

External links
 Bishops Past & Present

Primates in the Anglican Communion